9M or 9-M may refer to:

 Central Mountain Air (IATA: 9M)
 New York State Route 9M
 Northrop N-9M
 Period-after-opening symbol
 AIM-9M, a model of the AIM-9 Sidewinder
 ČZW-9M, a Czech submachine gun made by ČZW
 DE-9M, see D-subminiature
 FN FNP-9m, see FN Herstal FNP 
 Kappa 9M, a model of Kappa rocket
 PC-9M, see Pilatus PC-9
 Salmson 9M, several models of Salmson 9
 VF-9M, see VMF-111
 Yak-9M, see Yakovlev Yak-9
 9M, an aircraft registration prefix for Malaysia

See also
M9 (disambiguation)